Rick Fisher (born March 29, 1951) is a former professional tennis player from the United States.

Career
Fisher played collegiate tennis at Stanford University and was an All-American in 1973.

At the 1978 Grand Prix Cleveland tournament, Fisher was runner-up in the doubles, with Bruce Manson. His best singles result on tour came in the 1979 Australian Hard Court Tennis Championships, where he was a semi-finalist.

He had an upset straight sets win over second seed John Alexander at the 1979 Australian Open.

Grand Prix career finals

Doubles: 1 (0–1)

References

1951 births
Living people
American male tennis players
Stanford Cardinal men's tennis players
Tennis people from Illinois